The Republican Sena (translation: Republican Army;  RS) is a political party in India. It founded by Anandraj Ambedkar on 21 November 1998. Anandraj Ambedkar is son of Yashwant Ambedkar and grandson of B. R. Ambedkar. This party is based on ideology of B. R. Ambedkar i.e. Ambedkarism. The party is primarily based in Maharashtra state. Republican Sena's supporters occupied the Indu Mill land at Dadar, Mumbai in 2011 to highlight the long-pending demand for the Statue of Equality or the Bharatratna Dr. Babasaheb Ambedkar Memorial. The party has also worked with the Vanchit Bahujan Aaghadi, headed by Prakash Yashwant Ambedkar.

See also 
 Prakash Ambedkar
 Vanchit Bahujan Aaghadi
 Politics of India
 List of political parties in India
 Politics of Maharashtra

References 

Indian nationalist political parties
Political parties established in 1998
1998 establishments in Maharashtra
Ambedkarite political parties
Dalit politics
Buddhist political parties
Political parties in Maharashtra